

History 
The Royal Scottish National Orchestra (RSNO) Chorus evolved from a choir formed in 1843 (then the Glasgow Choral Union) to sing the first full performance of Handel’s Messiah in Scotland.  Today, the Chorus' main role is to perform alongside the Royal Scottish National Orchestra, which it does in around six different programmes each year, including an annual performance (usually on 2 January) of Handel's Messiah.

Membership 
The RSNO Chorus has around 120 members, from across the central belt of Scotland.  The Chorus rehearses on a Wednesday evening in Glasgow, at the RSNO's new purpose-built home, at 19 Killermont Street.  This purpose-built flexible 600-seat venue is used as a performance space, a rehearsal space for the Orchestra and Chorus, and as a recording facility (primarily for the RSNO, but also available for external use).  The venue has been described as 'state of the art' and 'world-class'.

The Chorus regularly holds open rehearsals to allow potential new members to join for an evening.

Artistic Team 
Gregory Batsleer - Chorus Director

The Chorus is directed by Gregory Batsleer.  In 2015, Gregory was announced that year's winner of the Arts Foundation Choral Conducting award.

Gregory splits his time between Scotland and London.  In Scotland he is also Chorus Director of the Scottish Chamber Orchestra Chorus, a post he has held since 2009, and in London he is the Artistic Director of the National Portrait Gallery’s Choir in Residence Programme and Principal Conductor of the Portrait Choir. 

Edward Cohen - Accompanist

The RSNO Chorus is accompanied in its weekly rehearsals by Edward Cohen.  Edward trained at the Royal Academy of Music, Indiana University, and the Royal Conservatoire of Scotland, where he currently holds a position as keyboard lecturer and staff accompanist. Edward also enjoys a busy freelance performing career, and works with a number of choirs and ensembles throughout Scotland and further afield.

Polly Beck - Vocal Coach

Polly studied at the RSAMD (now the Royal Conservatoire of Scotland), and later the Postgraduate Opera Course at the RNCM, for which she won an entrance scholarship. Polly returned to Scotland to work with Scottish Opera, and has performed as a soloist with several UK orchestras, and in many festivals.

Polly currently teaches, as a Vocal Instructor focusing on voice and performance skills, for Inverclyde Music Service. She is also Vocal Coach for Inverclyde Senior Choir, and teaches at the University of Glasgow, the Junior Conservatoire of the RCS and the National Youth Choir of Scotland.

RSNO Chorus Tours 
In addition to concerts throughout the year in Scotland, both with the RSNO and independently, the RSNO Chorus has been fortunate to be invited to perform with orchestras in many different parts of the world, often at the request of world-class conductors. The RSNO Chorus has most recently toured to Prague, where they performed Mozart's Requiem with the Czech National Symphony Orchestra, under the baton of Libor Pešek, as part of the Prague Proms.  The Chorus has also toured to Copenhagen, Hong Kong, Israel, and Australia, among others.

References

1843 establishments in Scotland
Musical groups established in 1843
Culture in Aberdeen
Culture in Dundee
Culture in Edinburgh
Music in Glasgow
Organisations based in Glasgow
National Orchestra
National performing arts companies of Scotland
Scottish
Arts organizations established in 1891